Zhu Yi is the name of the following Chinese people:

Zhu Yi (Three Kingdoms), officer of Wu in Three Kingdoms Period
Zhu Yi (Liang dynasty), official of Liang dynasty
Zhu Yi (swimmer), Olympic swimmer
Zhu Yi (figure skater), US-born Chinese figure skater